The 1933–34 Montreal Maroons season was the 10th season for the National Hockey League franchise.

Offseason

Regular season

Final standings

Record vs. opponents

Game log

Playoffs
They went against the Rangers and won 2 goals to 1 or 2–1.  They went against Chicago in the next round and lost 6 goals to 2, or 2–6.

Player stats

Regular season
Scoring

Goaltending

Playoffs
Scoring

Goaltending

Note: GP = Games played; G = Goals; A = Assists; Pts = Points; +/- = Plus/minus; PIM = Penalty minutes; PPG = Power-play goals; SHG = Short-handed goals; GWG = Game-winning goals
      MIN = Minutes played; W = Wins; L = Losses; T = Ties; GA = Goals against; GAA = Goals against average; SO = Shutouts;

Awards and records

Transactions

See also
1933–34 NHL season

References

External links

Montreal Maroons seasons
Montreal Maroons
Montreal Maroons